PayPal Park (formerly Earthquakes Stadium and Avaya Stadium) is a soccer-specific stadium in San Jose, California. It is the home stadium of the San Jose Earthquakes of Major League Soccer. The stadium is located on the Airport West site next to the San Jose International Airport.

PayPal Park officially opened on February 27, 2015, and has a capacity of approximately 18,000. The stadium features a canopy roof and some of the steepest-raked seating in Major League Soccer to provide a better view. Additionally, the area behind the northeast goal houses the largest outdoor bar in North America, a  fan zone and a double-sided video scoreboard. The suites and club seats are located at field level. The stadium is part of a mixed-use residential, retail, R&D, and hotel development.

The stadium was constructed privately with no public money provided by the city of San Jose. Additionally, Lewis Wolff, owner of the San Jose Earthquakes, offered to pay for the maintenance of the stadium for a 55-year time span. The team organization initially delayed the completion date to the middle of the 2014 MLS season, but later delayed it again to the 2015 season.
The seat pattern includes three different shades of blue as well as a smattering of red seats to pay homage to the club's NASL history. Additionally, the pattern contains the message "Go EQ" written in binary.

History and details

Planning
The proposal for the new stadium for the Earthquakes was brought before the San Jose City Council in June 2007. The proposal called for the city of San Jose to rezone a parcel of industrial land in the city's Edenvale district to residential uses. The parcel is owned by iStar Financial, but members of the Earthquakes ownership group own an option to purchase the land. Rezoning the parcel would increase the value of the property by approximately $80 million. The site's industrial capacity would be transferred to surrounding properties allowing those sites to increase the density of the developments on their land, eliminating early generation single level developments. This would also preserve the industrial capacity for the city in the Edenvale area. The option on the land would then be sold and the proceeds would be used to construct the soccer-specific stadium on the Airport West site (formerly the site of an FMC Corp. facility) at no cost to the city. Additionally, Wolff and his partners will be funding and building the mixed-use development adjacent to the stadium out of pocket.

On April 15, 2008, it was revealed that a deal to sell the Airport West site to the group headed by the Earthquakes ownership had been reached. The deal was approved after the May 21 vote by the San Jose city council. The purchase price was renegotiated between the city and ownership group in April 2009 to account for the lost value of the land due to the economic climate change since the original deal was struck. Additionally, the Earthquakes and their partners have reduced the purchased land size from the full  of the Airport West site to a smaller  parcel further reducing their purchase price to $89 million.

Lewis Wolff's ownership group's purchase of the Airport West site from the city of San Jose also alleviated the city of $7.5 million in tax service the city was paying on the site annually. The Airport West site had previously been purchased by the city for a possible expansion to the San Jose International Airport infrastructure. However, as of November 2007, the airport had indicated that the land is no longer needed in any current or projected developments.

The city estimates that the total development of both the Airport West and iStar site would bring approximately $1.3 billion worth of capital investment to San Jose and would bring in millions of dollars in tax revenues. The development would also provide new research and development, retail, and hotel jobs to the city. The iStar site would be developed with a mix of residential and commercial uses, while the Airport West site would be developed by Wolff with two hotels, as well as residential, research, and retail developments.

In a San Jose Mercury News article in August 2009, Lew Wolff backed off from publicly claiming a definite 2012 opening date for the stadium until a naming rights sponsor could be found and signed.

The first official public renderings of the stadium were released to the public on September 19, 2009 by team owner Lewis Wolff. The rezoning of the property was approved March 16, 2010 to allow for the construction of the stadium.

In April 2010, the Earthquakes completed construction and opened the Nutrilite Training Facility, including a training field adjacent to land intended for the new stadium.

In November 2010, Earthquakes ownership requested the City of San Jose for another amendment to the purchase option for the stadium site. The amendment reduces non-refundable option payments to the City by $2 million to $5 million as well as extends the option period from 2013 to 2015. If Earthquakes ownership closes on the property earlier, a reduction of $4 million in non-refundable option payments will occur. If the economic climate continues to preclude the implementation of the stadium, the option includes provisions for the City to consider allowing retail on the stadium site.

On January 20, 2011, the Earthquakes submitted an application to the city for a development permit.

Construction
The San Jose Earthquakes held a demolition ceremony at the stadium site on March 3, 2011 to kick off a 12-week demolition in advance of construction. On December 14, 2011, the planning commission approved the permit for stadium construction, which was subsequently appealed by residents nearby the site. On February 22, 2012, the commission heard the appeal and voted unanimously to reject the appeal and finalize the approval of the construction permit. The team organization stated they still planned to open the stadium in 2014.

The groundbreaking of the new stadium occurred on October 21, 2012, with 6,256 participants on hand digging into the ground, smashing the previous world record. An official Guinness World Records adjudicator was on site to verify the record.

Earthquakes President Dave Kaval stated in a February 2013 interview that stadium construction would begin by February 26, with the stadium on track for completion by early 2014.

However, while construction crews demolished and prepared the site for construction, they discovered three underground concrete bunkers and several hundred concrete pilings from the previous FMC factory. These obstacles caused the completion date for the stadium to be pushed back to July 2014. This was later revised to a scheduled completion date of early 2015. Demolition, grading, and the site utilities were installed by the middle of September 2013. The next steps in the process were the pouring of the foundations, followed by the steel erection.

The first steps taken in building the actual structure of the stadium occurred on September 27, 2013, when concrete pouring of the team building and locker rooms took place. This was followed by the stadium foundations.
The first steel beams for the stadium were laid on November 5, 2013, and on March 28, 2014, the final beam was hoisted in place. 

The first of the 18,000 seats were installed in the stadium on September 23, 2014.

Development
On November 19, 2014, Avaya was confirmed as the naming rights partner for the Earthquakes' new stadium, officially called Avaya Stadium, paying $20 million over a 10-year deal. In January 2017, Avaya filed for Chapter 11 bankruptcy and initially intended to retain the naming rights to the stadium, but in December, Avaya requested a federal judge to reduce their commitment to the agreement. After Avaya vacated their naming rights, the venue was renamed Earthquakes Stadium in 2020.

Ahead of the 2021 MLS season, the playing surface which had previously consisted of Kentucky bluegrass or Bermuda grass at various times was replaced with a SIS Pitches SISGrass hybrid surface featuring a blend of Kentucky bluegrass, ryegrass, and synthetic fiber.

On April 5, 2021, the Earthquakes announced that they had secured a new 10-year partnership with PayPal for the stadium to be named PayPal Park. As part of the agreement, PayPal Park was outfitted with PayPal and Venmo's digital payments technology.

Sports

Soccer
PayPal Park's first-ever match was the San Jose Earthquakes' final 2015 preseason game against the Los Angeles Galaxy on February 28, 2015, followed by the Earthquakes' 2015 regular season home opener against the Chicago Fire on March 22, 2015.

On May 10, 2015, the United States women's national soccer team played its first send-off series match ahead of the 2015 FIFA Women's World Cup, defeating the Republic of Ireland 3–0.

In 2016, PayPal Park hosted the MLS All-Star Game between the MLS All-Stars and the English Premier League's Arsenal, which the latter won 2–1.

PayPal Park has also hosted a number of exhibition matches featuring both domestic and international clubs, including 10 meetings between Liga MX sides.

Rugby
PayPal Park was also designed to host rugby matches. The stadium's first rugby match was a double-header for the 2015 World Rugby Pacific Nations Cup on July 18, 2015, between Canada and Japan, followed by the United States and Samoa.

Ultimate Frisbee
PayPal Park hosted the 2015 AUDL Championship on August 9, won by the local San Jose Spiders.

Lacrosse
PayPal Park hosted Week 9 of the 2019 Premier Lacrosse League season over the weekend of August 10–11.

International matches

Men's matches

Women's matches

Rugby Union

References

External links

 
 Memorandum of Understanding Concerning Business Terms for the Purchase and Sale of the Airport West Property and for the Development of a Major League Soccer Stadium (April 14, 2008)
 Amendment of Business Terms for the Option and Purchase and Sale of the Airport West Property (April 14, 2009)
 AMENDMENT OF BUSINESS TERMS FOR THE OPTION, PURCHASE, AND SALE OF THE AIRPORT WEST PROPERTY FOR DEVELOPMENT AND FOR DEVELOPMENT OF A MAJOR LEAGUE SOCCER STADIUM (November 30, 2010)
 Avaya Stadium at StadiumDB.com

 
Soccer venues in California
Rugby union stadiums in California
Lacrosse venues in California
Sports venues completed in 2015
Sports venues in San Jose, California
Premier Lacrosse League venues
2015 establishments in California
Venues of the 2028 Summer Olympics
Olympic football venues
Soccer in the San Francisco Bay Area